Christopher University  is located in Mowe,  Ogun State Nigeria.It was founded in 2015 and is recognized by the National Universities Commission.

References

External links

2015 establishments in Nigeria
Educational institutions established in 2015
Private universities and colleges in Nigeria
Education in Ogun State